The Cape Range clawless gecko (Crenadactylus tuberculatus) is a species of gecko endemic to Western Australia in Australia.

References

Crenadactylus
Reptiles described in 2016
Taxa named by Paul Doughty
Taxa named by Ryan J. Ellis
Taxa named by Paul M. Oliver
Reptiles of Western Australia